J. F. Johnston ( – ?) was an English amateur golfer who played in the mid-to-late 19th century. Johnston placed sixth in the 1862 Open Championship.

Early life
Johnston was born in England, circa 1840.

Golf career

1862 Open Championship
The 1862 Open Championship was the third Open Championship and was again held at Prestwick Golf Club, Ayrshire, Scotland. Four professionals and four amateurs contested the event, with Tom Morris, Sr. winning the championship for the second time, by 13 shots from Willie Park, Sr. Johnston carded rounds of 64-69-75=208.

Death
Johnston's dates of birth and death are unknown.

References

English male golfers
Amateur golfers
1840s births
Year of death missing